Vishwanath is a 1978 Indian Hindi-language action film directed by Subhash Ghai and produced by Pawan Kumar. It stars Shatrughan Sinha and Reena Roy in pivotal roles. The film was a flop in box office. The film was remade in Telugu as Lawyer Viswanath (1978) and in Tamil as Naan Mahaan Alla (1984).

Plot 
An honest lawyer, Vishwanath is implicated and imprisoned at the behest of powerful underworld don, GNK and his associates. After his release from prison, Vishwanath decides to seek vengeance, but finds out that it is virtually impossible to do this through due process of law. So he decides to change his identity, hire a gang of crooks and assassins, to carry out his vendetta. Not realizing that in doing this he is alienating himself from the love of his life, Soni; and making himself a wanted man by the police, leaving his crippled sister, Munni and mom, Shanti to fend for themselves, and at the mercy of GNK and his associates.

Cast 
 Shatrughan Sinha as Vishwanath
 Reena Roy as Soni
 Bharat Bhushan...Soni's father
 Rita Bhaduri...Munni
 Sulochana Latkar...Munni's mother
 Parikshit Sahni as Siddharth
 Prem Nath as GNK
 Sudhir as Jimmy
 Pran as Golu Gawah
 Madan Puri...Pukhraj
 Satyendra Kapoor...D.P. Lal
 Iftikhar...Commissinor SK Mahanta
 D. K. Sapru...Judge
 Mukri as sweets shop owner
 Birbal as Moti
 Manik Irani as Taleb
 Jagdish Raj as Francis
 Ranjeet...Khukha
 Madhu Malhotra...Zarina
 Lalita Pawar... Zarina's mother
 Viju Khote... Adv.Sharma
 Randhir (actor) ... Jholjhal
 Keshav Rana as GNK's associate in court
 Rakesh Pandey as Doctor Eye specialist
 Hari Shivdasani... Raj Kishan Mehta
 Raj Rani ... Mrs Raj Rani Mehta
 Rajan Haskar...Keshto dada
 Ratan Gaurang...John
 Kedarnath Saighal...Arab businessman Sonawala
 Yusuf Khan (actor)...Rivoli

Soundtrack 
The songs were composed by Rajesh Roshan. And penned by Anjaan.

References

External links 

1970s Hindi-language films
1978 action films
1978 films
Films about miscarriage of justice
Films directed by Subhash Ghai
Films scored by Rajesh Roshan
Hindi films remade in other languages
Indian action films